Michael Richard Strong (born 28 June 1974) was an English cricketer who played for Sussex and later on Northamptonshire. He was born in Cuckfield, Sussex.

Career
Strong only made two first-class appearances for Sussex. He then made the move to Northamptonshire in 2000 taking 31 wickets in his 13 first-class games spanning over two years. During a one-day game against Gloucestershire, he conceded a record 99 runs from his nine overs (a new record for the most expensive analysis in the one-day league surpassing Dominic Cork's 96 conceded against Nottinghamshire in a 50 over game in 1993, though he bowled only eight overs).

References

External links

1974 births
English cricketers
Sussex cricketers
Northamptonshire cricketers
People from Cuckfield
Living people
Sussex Cricket Board cricketers
People educated at Brighton College